Kladivo na čarodějnice (The Witches' Hammer) is a Czech history novel by Václav Kaplický. It was first published in 1963.

The story is set in 17th century, in a region surrounding Velké Losiny and Šumperk. It is based on a historical event, the witch trials in Northern Moravia during the 1670s orchestrated by inquisitor Boblig from Edelstat to which more than 100 people fell victim. The main character is dean Josef Lautner, a cleric who tries to help his people, but later becomes one of the innocent convicted as well.

Film adaptation

In 1970, Otakar Vávra and Ester Krumbachová adapted the novel for the film Witchhammer, directed by Vávra and starring Elo Romančík. The film was banned by the Czechoslovakian government.

References

Czech novels adapted into films
1963 Czech novels
Historical novels
Novels set in the 17th century